Champa Village,  is a village in the Madhubani district of Bihar State, India.

Geography

Economy
There are not many opportunities or resources despite agricultural land. Most of the residents are migrating to urban areas such as Delhi, Mumbai and Kolkata. The primary income of the village comes from the people who live in urban areas. Most of the people live below poverty level so the standards of living are low to inadequate.

Religion and caste
All the people of the village are Hindus. The various castes: Yadav, Brahman, kiyot  dhobi  etc. are living there.

Education
 Middle School Champa

Electoral Constituency
The electoral constituency Benipatti  vidhan Sabha madhubani

References

Villages in Madhubani district